Håkan Nils "Wicke" Wickberg (3 February 1943 – 8 December 2009) was a Swedish ice hockey centre who played over 300 games with Brynäs IF, winning the Swedish National Championship seven times as a player. He was awarded Guldpucken for the season of 1970–71.

He finished forth with the Sweden men's national ice hockey team at the 1968 and 1972 Winter Olympics, and won silver medals at the 1970 and 1973 World Championships.

References

External links

1943 births
2009 deaths
Brynäs IF players
Ice hockey players at the 1968 Winter Olympics
Ice hockey players at the 1972 Winter Olympics
Olympic ice hockey players of Sweden
People from Gävle
Swedish ice hockey centres
Sportspeople from Gävleborg County